Logan Gdula (born October 13, 1996) is an American professional soccer player who plays as a defender for Hartford Athletic.

Career

College and amateur
Gdula spent four years playing college soccer at Wake Forest University between 2015 and 2018, scoring 2 goals and tallying 14 assists in 77 appearances.

While at college, Gdula also appeared for USL PDL side North Carolina Fusion U23 in 2017 and 2018.

Professional
On January 11, 2019, Gdula was selected 13th overall in the 2019 MLS SuperDraft by FC Cincinnati.

On February 16, 2019, Gdula was loaned to USL Championship side Phoenix Rising.

On May 18, 2019, Gdula was recalled from his loan at Phoenix without having made a first team appearance. He was subsequently loaned to USL Championship side Hartford Athletic. He scored his first professional goal on June 22, 2019 in a 2–2 draw with Birmingham Legion. Gdula was waived by Cincinnati on January 29, 2020.

On February 12, 2020, he joined Charleston Battery.

On May 10, 2022, Gdula signed with USL Championship side Hartford Athletic.

References

External links
Wake Forest bio
FC Cincinnati bio
MLS bio

Living people
1996 births
American soccer players
Association football defenders
Wake Forest Demon Deacons men's soccer players
North Carolina Fusion U23 players
FC Cincinnati players
Phoenix Rising FC players
Hartford Athletic players
Charleston Battery players
Soccer players from Connecticut
USL League Two players
USL Championship players
FC Cincinnati draft picks